The Mask is a 1988 Italian romance film directed by Fiorella Infascelli. It was screened in the Un Certain Regard section at the 1988 Cannes Film Festival.

Cast
 Helena Bonham Carter as Iris
 Michael Maloney as Leonardo
 Feodor Chaliapin, Jr. as Leonardo's father
 Roberto Herlitzka as Elia
 Alberto Cracco as Viola
 Michele De Marchi as Theatre Company Manager
 Valentina Lainati as Maria
 Saskia Colombaioni as Saskia
 Arnaldo Colombaioni as Nani
 Valerio Colombaioni as Ercolino
 Walter Colombaioni as Acrobata
 Maria Tedeschi as Talia
 Massimo Fedele as Don Gaetano

References

External links

1988 films
1980s romance films
1980s Italian-language films
Films directed by Fiorella Infascelli
Films scored by Luis Bacalov
Italian romance films
1980s Italian films